Saint Martins is a civil parish in Saint John County, New Brunswick, Canada.

For governance purposes it is divided between the village of St. Martins and the local service district of the parish of Saint Martins, both of which are members of the Fundy Regional Service Commission (FRSC).

Origin of name
The Provincial Archives of New Brunswick gives only a possibility - St. Martins, Maryland, which could refer to either Saint Martin or Saint Martins by the Bay, both in Worcester County, Maryland.

History
Saint Martins was erected in 1786 as one of the county's original parish.

In 1837 the eastern end of Saint Martins was transferred to Westmorland County. The lost area is now part of Alma Parish in Albert County.

Boundaries
Saint Martins Parish is bounded:

 on the north by the Kings County line;
 on the east by the Albert County line;
 on the south by the Bay of Fundy and Quaco Bay;
 on the west by a line beginning at the shore of the Bay of Fundy and running northwesterly along the eastern line of a grant to Samuel Hugh at the mouth of Tynemouth Creek and its prolongation to the Kings County line.

Communities
Communities at least partly within the parish. bold indicates an incorporated municipality

 Bains Corner
 Bay View
 Burchills Flats
 Chester
 Fair View
 Grove Hill
 Hanford Brook
 Hardingville
 Little Beach
 Orange Hill
 Porter Road
 St. Martins
 Salmon River
 Shanklin
 Tynemouth Creek
 West Quaco

Bodies of water
Bodies of water at least partly within the parish.

 Big Salmon River
 Goose River
 Irish River
 Little Salmon River
 Mosher River
 Point Wolfe River
 Quiddy River
 South Stream
 Goose Creek
 Ten Mile Creek
 Tynemouth Creek
 Bay of Fundy
 Quaco Bay
 more than two dozen officially named lakes

Other notable places
Parks, historic sites, and other noteworthy places at least partly within the parish.
 Big Salmon River Protected Natural Area
 Dowdall Lake Protected Natural Area
 Fundy National Park
 Fundy Footpath
 Fundy Trail Parkway Provincial Park
 Little Salmon River Protected Natural Area
 Point Wolfe River Gorge Protected Natural Area
 Saddleback Brook Protected Natural Area

Demographics
Parish population total does not include village of St. Martins

Population
Population trend

Language
Mother tongue (2016)

Access Routes
Highways and numbered routes that run through the parish, including external routes that start or finish at the parish limits:

Highways

Principal Routes
None

Secondary Routes:
None

External Routes:
None

See also
List of parishes in New Brunswick

Notes

References

Parishes of Saint John County, New Brunswick
Local service districts of Saint John County, New Brunswick